The 2009–10 season was Port Vale's 98th season of football in the English Football League, and second successive season in League Two. Micky Adams received plaudits for his first full season in charge. He took a squad of players that had previously been near the bottom of the division and made them difficult to beat, taking them to a tenth-place finish, just outside the play-offs. In the League Cup Vale defeated two Championship sides to reach the Third Round stage. They also exited the League Trophy at the Third Round, and the FA Cup at the Second Round, whilst the reserve side finished as Staffordshire Senior Cup runners-up. Marc Richards hit 23 goals, whilst Player of the Year Anthony Griffith was also an essential part of the first eleven.

Overview

League Two
The pre-season saw a new manager appointed – experienced 47-year-old Micky Adams arrived at Vale Park on 5 June 2009. Chairman Bill Bratt stated that Adams' goal would be to stabilize the club, a point reiterated by observers such as Robbie Earle, as well as Adams himself. He made his first signing on 15 June, bringing 21-year-old Tommy Fraser to the club on a free transfer, who had played for Adams at Brighton. He appointed Fraser as club captain. After confirming the signing of Adam Yates, who was linked to the club before Adams' arrival, Adams signed Doug Loft, who had also played under him at Brighton. After a pre-season friendly, Adams considered switching to a 3–5–2 formation for the season. On 21 July, it was announced that Adams had appointed veteran striker Geoff Horsfield as player-assistant manager. He was still strengthening his squad early in the season, signing midfielders Jason Jarrett, Kris Taylor and Claus Bech Jørgensen on short-term deals. He also signed Jamie Guy on loan from Colchester United, Damien McCrory on loan from Plymouth Argyle, and winger Lewis Haldane from Bristol Rovers – Haldane would later make the move permanent in January. In order to raise cash he placed six youngsters on the transfer list.

The season started with just one defeat in the first seven league games, demonstrating how Adams had made his side difficult to beat. Joe Anyon returned to fitness to play a reserve game on 23 September, but failed to displace teenager Chris Martin. After a period of three defeats in seven days, including being knocked out of the League Cup at the third round, Adams decided to place his whole squad on the transfer list, saying of his team's performance: "We looked like a woman who had a big fur coat on but underneath she’s got no knickers on." It was a controversial move, one that divided opinion among analysts and fans, also bringing the fourth tier club to national attention. The move appeared to many to be a motivational tactic. He later admitted he merely played "a psychological game with them... [and] I don't think they fell for it – I don't think anybody fell for it". Luke Prosser and Danny Glover both were shipped off to Conference National side Salisbury City on one-month loan deals. Steve Thompson was released from his contract to join Telford United. Three wins – including a cup win over League One Stockport County and a league win at local rivals Crewe Alexandra – and three draws within four weeks saw Adams nominated for the League Two Manager of the Month award for October 2009. He signed a contract extension in November 2009, keeping him at the club until summer 2012.

In November, Sam Stockley took the decision to retire on medical advice, having suffered an eye injury. However he later joined Hungarian club Ferencvárosi TC as a player-coach. This allowed Adam Yates to make the right-back spot his own. Glover also left the club for a loan spell at Rochdale. Arriving at the club was Bristol Rovers loanee Sean Rigg, who would sign permanently at the season's end.

In the January 2010 transfer window Adams signed Lewis Haldane permanently, with Sean Rigg and Craig Davies signing on loan. In February, Anyon returned to the starting line after young rival Martin was rested. He performed well over seven games, but made two costly errors that resulted in two goals and dropped points in the play-off hunt. Thus he was consigned to the bench until the season's end. Luke Prosser, Danny Glover and Ross Davidson were also informed they would not be offered new contracts, and Prosser immediately joined James Lawrie on loan at Kidderminster Harriers. Both Glover and Davidson joined Stafford Rangers on loan. Adams' men stormed into the play-off places for the first time in the season with just two games left to play, following a 2–1 win over champions-elect Notts County. Yet with just one point from their final two games, the Vale finished just outside the play-off zone.

They finished in tenth place with 68 points, boasting the best goals conceded tally outside of the top three. They were four points short of Dagenham & Redbridge in the play-off zone – who would go on to win the play-off final. Only runaway champions Notts County lost fewer games than Vale, though only Macclesfield Town and Cheltenham Town picked up more draws. Marc Richards was the club's top-scorer with 23 goals, more than double that of his nearest rival.

At the end of the season Joe Anyon was offered a new contract at Vale Park on reduced pay, but instead signed with Lincoln City. Chris Martin signed a new two-year contract, which came with an increase in wages. Released players moved on to other clubs: Luke Prosser (Southend United); Simon Richman and Danny Glover (Worcester City); David Howland (Glentoran); and James Lawrie (AFC Telford United). Ross Davidson also joined Stafford Rangers, after having spent much of the season loan at the club, as well as a brief time at Nantwich Town. Geoff Horsfield retired as a player to concentrate on his role as assistant manager.

Finances
On the financial side rumours abounded. In July 2009, Bill Bratt spoke out to publicly deny rumours spread on Vale fan sites, specifically rumours of sponsorship deals with Basement Jaxx and Maplin Electronics. Bratt said the rumours were "inaccurate, spurious and damaging", claiming the speculation could damage genuine and confidential negotiations. In November, Bratt announced that he was planning to retire as chairman at the end of the season, though he later decided to stay on. Reports that Andy Townsend would be appointed as a football advisor also surfaced, but never transpired. There also came statements that shirt sponsors Harlequin Property would invest £500,000 into the club, though again this never materialized. Stoke-on-Trent city council gave the club a two-year repayment holiday for a £2.25 million loan taken out in 2005.

Cup competitions
In the FA Cup, Vale advanced past Stevenage after a replay, with a 1–0 win at Broadhall Way. This ended Stevenage's year-long unbeaten home record. They were then defeated 1–0 by League One Huddersfield Town in the Second Round.

In the League Cup, the club beat Championship side Sheffield United 2–1 at Bramall Lane in the First Round. The Vale then defeated Sheffield Wednesday 2–0 in the Second Round, with goals from Adams' signing Kris Taylor and Rob Taylor – a player not appreciated under Dean Glover. It was only after this game that Adams actually signed his managerial contract – two months after taking charge. The delay was blamed on 'legal complications'. Vale then took another Championship side, Scunthorpe United, to extra time at Glanford Park, before succumbing to a 2–0 defeat.

In the League Trophy, Vale knocked out Stockport County with a 3–1  win, before exiting at the Third Round after losing out to Bradford City at Valley Parade in a penalty shoot-out.

League table

Results
Port Vale's score comes first

Football League Two

Results by matchday

Matches

FA Cup

League Cup

League Trophy

Player statistics

Appearances

Top scorers

Disciplinary record

Sourced from Soccerway.

Awards

Transfers

Transfers in

Transfers out

Loans in

Loans out

References
Specific

General
Soccerbase

Port Vale F.C. seasons
Port Vale